Kot Garewal is a village in the Phillaur tehsil of Jalandhar District of the Indian state of Punjab. The village is administered by the Sarpanch, an elected representative.

Demographics 
According to the 2011 Census, the village has a population of 1045. The village has a literacy rate of 82.17%, higher than the average literacy rate of Punjab.

Most villagers belong to a Schedule Caste (SC), comprising 69.57% of the total.

Transport

Rail 

Airport 

References 

Villages in Jalandhar district
Villages in Phillaur tehsil